Subvertising (a portmanteau of subvert and advertising) is the practice of making spoofs or parodies of corporate and political advertisements. The cultural critic Mark Dery coined the term in 1991. Subvertisements are anti-ads that deflect advertising's attempts to turn the people's attention in a given direction. According to author Naomi Klein, subvertising offers a way of speaking back to advertising, ‘forcing a dialogue where before there was only a declaration.’ They may take the form of a new image or an alteration to an existing image or icon, often in a satirical manner.

A subvertisement can also be referred to as a meme hack and can be a part of social hacking, billboard hacking or culture jamming. According to Adbusters, a Canadian magazine and a proponent of counter-culture and subvertising, "A well-produced 'subvert' mimics the look and feel of the targeted ad, promoting the classic 'double-take' as viewers suddenly realize they have been duped. Subverts create cognitive dissonance, with the apparent aim of cutting through the 'hype and glitz of our mediated reality' to reveal a 'deeper truth within'.

Subvertising is a type of advertising hijacking (détournement publicité), where détournement techniques developed in the 1950s by the French Letterist International and later used by the better-known Situationist International have been used as a contemporary critical form to re-route advertising messages.

In 1972, the logo of Richard Nixon's reelection campaign posters was subverted with two x's in Nixon's name (as in the Exxon logo) to suggest the corporate ownership of the Republican party.

Notable instances
In Sydney, Australia in October 1979, a group of anti-smoking activists formed a group called B.U.G.A.U.P. and began altering the text on tobacco billboards to subvert the messages of tobacco advertisers, although advertisements for other unhealthy products were also targeted.

On November 6, 2008, The Yes Men recruited thousands of social activists to hand out 100,000 copies of a spoof New York Times newspaper set six months in the future. The goal was to utilize a tangible and trusted medium, the New York Times, to argue for a particular future. Other groups involved with this project included Anti-Advertising Agency, Code Pink, United for Peace and Justice, May First/People Link, and Improv Everywhere.

At the 2015 Paris COP21 climate conference, the collective known as Brandalism installed 600 posters that attacked what they perceived as the hypocrisy of corporate sponsors.

In 2017, Brandalism and other groups of subvertisers founded the collective Subvertisers International. Using billboard hacking and other forms of subvertising, they promote the idea that advertising creates unhealthy body images, impacts democracy negatively, and sustains a culture of consumerism that takes a heavy toll on the planet.

Around 2018, a group in London called Legally Black changed the race of the characters in Harry Potter posters from white to black.

In 2022, billboards in London, Bristol, Manchester, Sheffield and Brighton, and 11 other European cities, were hijacked to highlight role of airline emissions in the Climate crisis. They highlighted the large carbon footprint of flying, that the majority of flights are taken by a tiny fraction of the total population, and that airlines have missed all but one of the industry’s self-imposed sustainability targets.

See also

Anti-Advertising Agency
Brandalism
CODEPINK
Criticism of advertising
Culture jamming
Cultures of Resistance
Czech Dream
Darren Cullen (cartoonist)
Doppelgänger brand image
Hungarian Two Tailed Dog Party
Improv Everywhere
May First/People Link
Meme hack
United for Peace and Justice
Wacky Packages (humor)

References

External links

Adbusters.org

Advertising
Culture jamming techniques
Guerilla art and hacking art
Promotion and marketing communications
Derivative works